JS Sawakaze (DDG-170) is the third ship of the Tachikaze-class destroyer built for the Japan Maritime Self-Defense Force (JMSDF).

Development 
Tachikaze-class destroyers were designed almost exclusively as anti-aircraft platforms. No helicopter facilities are provided, and the ASW armament is confined to ASROC missiles and Mk 46 torpedoes. In order to save on construction costs the class adopted the propulsion plant and machinery of the Haruna-class destroyers.

Construction and career 
She was laid down on the 14 September 1979 in Mitsubishi shipyard in Nagasaki. She was launched on 4 June 1981, and commissioned on 30 March 1983.

She participated in the Exercise RIMPAC 1984.

From April 25 to July 13, 1985, she participated in the US dispatch training with the escort vessels JDS Shirane and JDS Asakaze.

She participated in the Exercise RIMPAC 1986.

She participated in the Exercise RIMPAC 1988.

She participated in the Exercise RIMPAC 1990.

She participated in the Exercise RIMPAC 1992.

From June 15 to September 5, 1995, she participated in the US dispatch training with the escort ship JDS Haruna and three P-3C aircraft.

On February 13, 2002, based on the Act on Special Measures Against Terrorism, dispatched to the Indian Ocean along with the escort ship JDS Haruna and the supply ship JDS Tokiwa. She was engaged in missions until June of the same year, and returned to Sasebo on July 5.

On March 15, 2007, she became a ship under the direct control of the escort fleet and the honeport was transferred to Yokosuka. She succeeded JS Tachikaze and assumed the role of the flagship of the 5th escort fleet. When it became a flagship, it was not modified in particular.

On June 25, 2010, she was decommissioned along with the escort ship JS Hatsuyuki to the Yokosuka District Chief, Sadayoshi Matsuoka, and retired. The total nautical mile was 691,913 nautical miles (about 1.28 million kilometers).

In April 2011, she was dismantled at Etajima.

References

External links

1981 ships
Tachikaze-class destroyers
Ships built by Mitsubishi Heavy Industries